NFL Quarterback Club is an American football video game series that was published by Acclaim.

Games
The games in the series include:

NFL Quarterback Club
NFL Quarterback Club 96
NFL Quarterback Club 97
NFL Quarterback Club 98
NFL Quarterback Club 99
NFL Quarterback Club 2000
NFL QB Club 2001
NFL QB Club 2002

References